DXR may refer to:

 DXR, a class of locomotives in New Zealand
 Danbury Municipal Airport (IATA code), Danbury, Connecticut
 Digital X-ray radiogrammetry, a method for measuring bone mineral density
 Doxorubicin, an anthracycline antibiotic used in cancer chemotherapy
 DXP reductoisomerase, an enzyme
 DirectX Raytracing, a computer graphics interface for real-time raytracing